Berdale (Maay: Berdaali) is a town in the southern Bay region of Somalia, in South West State of Somalia, and is also known as Bardale. It is the center of the Berdale District.

On 4 May, 2020, this was the site of an aircraft shootdown incident. A chartered cargo flight carrying medical supplies and mosquito nets, including supplies to assist in the coronavirus pandemic, was shot down by Ethiopian troops fearing a suicide attack.

References 

Berdale

Populated places in Bay, Somalia